This is the discography for American musician Charlie Wilson.

Albums

Singles

Featured collaborations

Notes

References

Discographies of American artists
Hip hop discographies
Rhythm and blues discographies